Poothadi  is a village near Kenichira, Panamaram area in Wayanad district in the state of Kerala, India.

Demographics
 India census, Poothadi had a population of 14849 with 7445 males and 7404 females.

History
According to local legend, Bhima of Mahabharata, when he was travelling with his brothers, went in search of the flower 'kalyanasaugandhika'. He asked about the flower to a 'raakshasi' in the Malayalam language 'Poovu Tharumo' which eventually became 'Poothadi'

Notorious Abduction
Poothadi village filled the national headlines when the communist activists abducted Mr. V.N.Sasi of the Congress party to retain their rule in the village administration. The abduction came a few days before the communists were facing a no-confidence motion against their elected president.  Mr.Sasi originally won the election on a communist ticket but unscrupulously shifted to the congress party after winning the election. 
The abduction became very sensation in the backward district of Wayanad and people even blocked the road at Kenichira.  The division bench of the Kerala highcourt directly intervened in the issue.  According to the police, a vehicle was hired in Meenangadi town and used for the abduction.

Important Landmarks
 Paradevatha Temple, Poothadi
 Mahavishnu Temple, Poothadi
 Bhagavathi Temple, Poothadi
 Saraswathy Temple, Poothadi
 St Thomas Evangelical Church of India, Mankodu - Poothaadi
 Poothadi Higher Secondary School, Poothadi
 94 year old Panchayath U.P.School, Poothadi

Transportation
Poothadi village can be accessed from Mananthavady or Kalpetta. The Periya ghat road connects Mananthavady to Kannur and Thalassery.  The Thamarassery mountain road connects Calicut with Kalpetta. The Kuttiady mountain road connects Vatakara with Kalpetta and Mananthavady. The Palchuram mountain road connects Kannur and Iritty with Mananthavady.  The road from Nilambur to Ooty is also connected to Wayanad through the village of Meppadi.

The nearest railway station is at Mysore and the nearest airports are Kozhikode International Airport-120 km, Bengaluru International Airport-290 km, and   Kannur International Airport, 58 km.

Image Gallery

References 

Sultan Bathery area
Villages in Wayanad district